Homocea is a commune located in Vrancea County, Romania. It is composed of three villages: Costișa, Homocea and Lespezi.

References

Communes in Vrancea County
Localities in Western Moldavia